Marc Tolon Brown (born November 25, 1946) is an American author and illustrator of children's books. Brown writes as well as illustrates the Arthur book series and is best known for creating that series and its numerous spin-offs. The names of his two sons, Tolon Adam and Tucker Eliot, have been hidden in all of the Arthur books except for one. He also has a daughter named Eliza, whose name appears hidden in at least two books. He is a three-time Emmy award winner; the Arthur TV series adapted from the books was named number one on PBS for three years (1997, 2000, 2001). He also served as an executive producer on the show during seasons ten through twenty-five. He currently lives in Hingham, Massachusetts.

Early life and education
While growing up in Erie, Pennsylvania, with his three sisters, Brown was told many stories by his grandmother Thora. This inspired Brown to write stories of his own in the later years of his life. An example of this was the "borrowing" of his 7th grade algebra teacher's name Mr. Rathbun for the character Mr. Ratburn. It was Grandma Thora who also fueled Brown's affinity for drawing, which was discovered at the age of six. While attending McDowell Senior High School, his art teacher, Nancy Bryan, introduced him to watercolors, which he now uses for the majority of his illustrations. Brown was inspired by other artists like Marc Chagall. Maurice Sendak, the author of the children's book Where the Wild Things Are, also influenced Brown in deciding on a career choice.

With the help of his Grandma Thora, Brown was able to major in graphic design at the Cleveland Institute of Art. Even with the opposition from his colleagues, Brown continued with his dream to be a children's book illustrator. After graduating, Brown presented a sample of his drawings to the publishing company Houghton Mifflin, in Boston, Massachusetts, who offered him a USD$5,000 deal. This offer allowed Brown to confirm his decision of making professional illustrating his career. In 1969, he began part-time teaching at Garland Junior College in Boston and illustrated textbooks.

Career
He had many different jobs before focusing solely on his writing career. He was a truck driver, a short-order cook, a TV art director, and finally a college professor. Brown said his professorship was short-lived as the college went bankrupt one semester into his hiring.

Bibliography

Arthur Adventure Series
1976 - Arthur's Nose
1979 - Arthur's Eyes
1980 - Arthur's Valentine
1981 - The True Francine
1982 - Arthur Goes to Camp
1982 - Arthur's Halloween
1983 - Arthur's April Fool
1983 - Arthur's Thanksgiving
1984 - Arthur's Christmas
1985 - Arthur's Tooth
1986 - Arthur's Teacher Trouble
1987 - D.W. Flips
1987 - Arthur's Baby
1988 - D.W. All Wet
1989 - Arthur's Birthday
1990 - Arthur's Pet Business
1991 - Arthur Meets the President (Early Moments)
1992 - Arthur Babysits
1993 - D.W. Thinks Big
1993 - D.W. Rides Again
1993 - Arthur's Family Vacation
1993 - Arthur's New Puppy
1994 - Arthur's Chicken Pox
1994 - Arthur's First Sleepover
1995 - D.W., the Picky Eater
1995 - Arthur's TV Trouble
1995 - Arthur Goes to School
1996 - Arthur Writes a Story
1996 - Arthur's Reading Race
1996 - Glasses for D.W.
1996 - Arthur's Neighborhood
1996 - Arthur and the True Francine
1997 - Arthur's Computer Disaster
1997 - Say the Magic Word
1997 - D.W.'s Lost Blankie
1997 - Arthur's Really Helpful Word Book
1997 - Arthur Tricks the Tooth Fairy
1998 - Arthur Lost and Found
1998 - Arthur's Really Helpful Bedtime Stories
1998 - Arthur Decks the Hall 
1999 - Arthur's Underwear
2000 - Arthur's Teacher Moves In
2000 - Arthur's Perfect Christmas
2002 - Arthur, It's Only Rock 'n' Roll
2006 - Arthur Jumps into Fall
2011 - Arthur Turns Green

Arthur audiobooks
 2000 - Marc Brown's Arthur Chapter Books: Volume 1 - (Arthur's Mystery Envelope, Arthur and the Scare-Your-Pants-Off Club, and Arthur Makes the Team)
 2000 - Marc Brown's Arthur Chapter Books: Volume 2 - (Arthur and the Crunch Cereal Contest, Arthur Accused!, and Locked in the Library)
 2000 - Marc Brown's Arthur Chapter Books: Volume 3 - (Buster's Dino Dilemma, The Mystery of the Stolen Bike, and Arthur and the Lost Diary)
 2000 - Marc Brown's Arthur Chapter Books: Volume 4 - (Who's in Love with Arthur?, Arthur Rocks with Binky, and Arthur and the Popularity Contest)
 2000 - Marc Brown's Arthur Chapter Books: Volume 5 - (King Arthur, Francine, Believe It or Not, and Arthur and the Cootie-Catcher)
 2007 - Arthur's Audio Favorites Volume 1 - (Arthur's Tooth, Arthur's Birthday, Arthur's Pet Business, Arthur's New Puppy, and Arthur Writes a Story)
 2009 - Arthur's Audio Favorites Volume 2 - (Arthur's Family Vacation, Arthur Goes to Camp, Arthur Babysits, Arthur Meets the President, Arthur's Baby, and Arthur's Halloween)

Beginner books
1980 - Pickle Things
1980 - Witches Four
1982 - Wings on Things (Early Moments)
1983 - Spooky Riddles
1985 - The Bionic Bunny Show
1985 - Hand Rhymes - collected and illustrated by Marc Brown
1986 - A World Full of Monsters (illustrated)
1995 - D.W. the Picky Eater (Early Moments)
1996 - Glasses for D.W.
1996 - Arthur's Reading Race (Early Moments)
1999 - Arthur In A Pickle (Early Moments)
1998 - Arthur Tricks the Tooth Fairy (Early Moments)
1999 - D.W., Go to Your Room!
2000 - Arthur's Teacher Moves In (Early Moments)
2001 - D.W.'s Library Card
2002 - Arthur's Animal Adventure (Early Moments)
2006 - D.W. Goes to Preschool
2008 - D.W. Says Please and Thank You

Chapter books
Arthur's Mystery Envelope
Arthur and the Scare-Your-Pants-Off Club
Arthur Makes the Team
Arthur and the Crunch Cereal Contest
Arthur Accused!
Locked in the Library!
Buster's Dino Dilemma
The Mystery of the Stolen Bike
Arthur and the Lost Diary
Who's in Love with Arthur?
Arthur Rocks with Binky
Arthur and the Popularity Test
King Arthur
Francine, Believe It or Not
Arthur and the Cootie-Catcher
Buster Makes the Grade
Muffy's Secret Admirer
Arthur and the Poetry Contest
Buster Baxter, Cat Saver
Arthur and the Big Blow-Up
Arthur and the Perfect Brother
Francine the Superstar
Buster's New Friend
Binky Rules
Arthur and the Double Dare
Arthur and the No-Brainer
Arthur and the Comet Crisis
Arthur and the 1,001 Dads
Arthur Plays the Blues
Arthur and the Bad-Luck Brain
Arthur Loses His Marbles
Arthur and the Nerves of Steal
Arthur and the World Record

Good Sports chapter books

Arthur and the Race to Read
Arthur and the Seventh-Inning Stretcher
Arthur and the Recess Rookie
Arthur and the Best Coach Ever
Arthur and the Goalie Ghost
Arthur and the Pen-Pal Playoff

Books written and illustrated by Marc Brown
 Monkey: Not Ready for Kindergarten
 In New York
 Marc Brown's Playtime Rhymes: A Treasury for Families to Learn and Play Together
 What Do You Call a Dumb Bunny? And Other Rabbit Riddles, Games, Jokes, and Cartoons

Books illustrated by Marc Brown
Mary McScary by R. L. Stine
The Little Shop of Monsters by R. L. Stine 
Ten Tiny Toes by Todd Tarpley 
Wild About Books by Judy Sierra (Early Moments)
Born to Read by Judy Sierra
Farmyard Beat by Lindsey Craig
Dancing Feet by Lindsey Craig
ZooZical by Judy Sierra
Wild About You by Judy Sierra
Little Witch's Big Night (Step into Reading) by Deborah Hautzig
Happy Birthday, Little Witch (Step into Reading) by Deborah Hautzig
Rabbit's New Rug (Parents Magazine Books) by Judy Delton
If All the Animals Came Inside by Eric Pinder
What Makes the Sun Shine? by Isaac Asimov
The Gulps by Rosemary Wells
Read-Aloud Rhymes For the Very Young by Jack Prelutsky
The Banza: A Haitian Story by Diane Wolkstein

Books by Laurene Krasny Brown and Marc Brown
Dino Life Guides for Families
Dinosaurs Travel
Dinosaurs Alive and Well!: A Guide to Good Health
How to Be a Friend: A Guide to Making Friends and Keeping Them
When Dinosaurs Die: A Guide to Understanding Death
Dinosaurs Divorce
Other
What's the Big Secret?: Talking about Sex with Girls and Boys

Arthur 8x8 paperbacks
Arthur's Birthday Surprise
Arthur's Heart Mix-Up
Arthur's Jelly Beans
Arthur and the Big Snow
Arthur Helps Out
Arthur to the Rescue
Arthur and the Dog Show
Arthur Jumps into Fall
Arthur's Tree House
Arthur Off to School
Good Night D.W.
Arthur's Homework
D.W.'s Perfect Present
Arthur's Mystery Babysitter
D.W. The Big Boss
Arthur Tells a Story

References

External links 
 Official website

1946 births
Living people
American children's writers
Daytime Emmy Award winners
American children's book illustrators
Writers from Erie, Pennsylvania
Artists from Erie, Pennsylvania
Cleveland Institute of Art alumni